Mike Tyson (born 1966) is an American former boxer.

Mike Tyson or Michael Tyson may also refer to:

Michael Tyson (antiquary) (1740–1780), English clergyman
Mike Tyson (baseball) (born 1950), American former baseball player
Mike Tyson (American football) (born 1993), American football player